Mayo Field may refer to:

In the United States:
 Mayo Field, Centenary College in Shreveport, Louisiana
 Mayo Field, Rochester, Minnesota